Chkalovske is an urban-type settlement in Chuhuiv Raion of Kharkiv Oblast in Ukraine. It is located in the steppe east of the city of Chuhuiv and west of Kupiansk. Chkalovske hosts the administration of Chkalovske settlement hromada, one of the hromadas of Ukraine. The settlement’s population is

History

2022 Russian invasion of Ukraine
From 16 March to 8 September, Chkalovske was occupied by Russian forces during the Russian invasion of Ukraine.

Economy

Transportation
Prolisnyi railway station is located in Chkalovske. It is on the railway connecting Kharkiv and Kupiansk via Chuhuiv. There is regular passenger traffic.

The settlement has road access to Highway M03 connecting Kharkiv and Sloviansk as well as to Highway H23 connecting Kharkiv and Sievierodonetsk via Kupiansk.

References

Urban-type settlements in Chuhuiv Raion